There exist a number of perspectives on the relationship of Islam and democracy among Islamic political theorists, the general Muslim public, and Western authors.

In 2021, a number of Muslim majority countries are Islamic and secular democracies.

Many Muslim scholars have argued that traditional Islamic notions such as shura (consultation), maslaha (public interest), and ʿadl (justice) justify representative government institutions which are similar to Western democracy, but reflect Islamic rather than Western liberal values. Still others have advanced liberal democratic models of Islamic politics based on pluralism and freedom of thought. Some Muslim thinkers have advocated secularist views of Islam.

A number of different attitudes regarding democracy are also represented among the general Muslim public, with polls indicating that majorities in the Muslim world desire a political model where democratic institutions and values can coexist with the values and principles of Islam, seeing no contradiction between the two.

Traditional political concepts

Quran
Muslim democrats, including Ahmad Moussalli (professor of political science at the American University of Beirut), argue that concepts in the Quran point towards some form of democracy, or at least away from despotism. These concepts include shura (consultation), ijma (consensus), al-hurriyya (freedom), al-huqquq al-shar'iyya (legitimate rights). For example, shura (Al Imran – Quran 3:159, Ash-Shura – Quran 42:38) may include electing leaders to represent and govern on the community's behalf. Government by the people is not therefore necessarily incompatible with the rule of Islam, whilst it has also been argued that rule by a religious authority is not the same as rule by a representative of God. This viewpoint, however, is disputed by more traditional Muslims. Moussalli argues that despotic Islamic governments have abused the Quranic concepts for their own ends: "For instance, shura, a doctrine that demands the participation of society in running the affairs of its government, became in reality a doctrine that was manipulated by political and religious elites to secure their economic, social and political interests at the expense of other segments of society," (In Progressive Muslims 2003).

Sunni Islam
Deliberations of the Caliphates, most notably the Rashidun Caliphate, were not democratic in the modern sense rather, decision-making power lay with a council of notable and trusted companions of Muhammad and representatives of different tribes (most of them selected or elected within their tribes).

In the early Islamic Caliphate, the head of state, the Caliph, had a position based on the notion of a successor to Muhammad's political authority, who, according to Sunnis, was ideally elected by the people or their representatives, as was the case for the election of Abu Bakr, Umar ibn Al Khattab, Uthman, and Ali as Caliph. After the Rashidun Caliphs, later Caliphates during the Islamic Golden Age had a much lesser degree of collective participation, but since "no one was superior to anyone else except on the basis of piety and virtue" in Islam, and following the example of Muhammad, later Islamic rulers often held public consultations with the people in their affairs.

The legislative power of the Caliph (or later, the Sultan) was always restricted by the scholarly class, the ulama, a group regarded as the guardians of Islamic law. Since the law came from the legal scholars, this prevented the Caliph from dictating legal results. Sharia rulings were established as authoritative based on the ijma (consensus) of legal scholars, who theoretically acted as representatives of the Ummah (Muslim community). After law colleges (madrasas) became widespread beginning with the 11th and 12th century CE, a student often had to obtain an ijaza-t al-tadris wa-l-ifta ("license to teach and issue legal opinions") in order to issue legal rulings. In many ways, classical Islamic law functioned like a constitutional law.

Bangladeshi Islamic scholar Khandaker Abdullah Jahangir said in a scholarly interview about Islam and democracy that,

Salafi view
Salafi scholars opine that democracy is haram in Islam, but they legitimize the opportunity to use democracy to come to power and to vote to establish Islamic rule and encourage voting to choose the better between evils, among these scholars are Shaykh Abd al-Aziz bin Baz, Shaykh Muhammad ibn Uthaymeen, Abdullah al-Ghudayyan, Abdullah Quyud, Abdur Razzaq Afifi, Senior Scholars of Saudi Arabia: Grand Mufti Shaykh Abdul Aziz Ash-Shaikh, Shaykh Abdul Muhsin Al-Abbad, Shaykh Wasiullah Abbas and Saudi Arabia's most senior fatwa panel of scholars, "Permanent Committee for Scholarly Research and Ifta", all echoed similar calls to encourage Muslims to vote.

Khandaker Abdullah Jahangir in his book ("Hadiser Namey Jaliyati") (Forgery in the Name of Hadith) says about the interpretation of Hadith of democratic Islamist parties about Islamic politics ,

Shia Islam
According to the Shia understanding, Muhammad named as his successor (as leader, with Muhammad being the final prophet), his son-in-law, and cousin Ali. Therefore, the first three of the four elected "Rightly Guided" Caliphs recognized by Sunnis (Ali being the fourth), are considered usurpers, notwithstanding their having been "elected" through some sort of conciliar deliberation (which the Shia do not accept as a representative of the Muslim society of that time). The largest Shia grouping—the Twelvers branch—recognizes a series of Twelve Imams, the last of which (Muhammad al-Mahdi, the Hidden Imam) is still alive and the Shia are waiting for his "reappearance".

Theoretical perspectives on democracy

Al-Farabi
The early Islamic philosopher, Al-Farabi (c. 872–950), in one of his most notable works Al-Madina al-Fadila, theorized an ideal Islamic state which he compared to Plato's The Republic. Al-Farabi departed from the Platonic view in that he regarded the ideal state to be ruled by the prophet, instead of the philosopher king envisaged by Plato. Al-Farabi argued that the ideal state was the city-state of Medina when it was governed by Muhammad, as its head of state, as he was in direct communion with God whose law was revealed to him. In the absence of the prophet, Al-Farabi considered democracy as the closest to the ideal state, regarding the republican order of the Rashidun Caliphate as an example within early Muslim history. However, he also maintained that it was from democracy that imperfect states emerged, noting how the republican order of the early Islamic Caliphate of the Rashidun caliphs was later replaced by a form of government resembling a monarchy under the Umayyad and Abbasid dynasties.

Varieties of modern Islamic theories
Muslih and Browers identify three major perspectives on democracy among prominent Muslims thinkers who have sought to develop modern, distinctly Islamic theories of socio-political organization conforming to Islamic values and law:

 The rejectionist Islamic view, elaborated by Sayyid Qutb and Abul A'la Maududi, condemns imitation of foreign ideas, drawing a distinction between Western democracy and the Islamic doctrine of shura (consultation between ruler and ruled). This perspective, which stresses comprehensive implementation of sharia, was widespread in the 1970s and 1980s among various movements seeking to establish an Islamic state, but its popularity has diminished in recent years.
 The moderate Islamic view stresses the concepts of maslaha (public interest), ʿadl (justice), and shura (consultation). Islamic leaders are considered to uphold justice if they promote public interest, as defined through shura. In this view, shura provides the basis for representative government institutions that are similar to Western democracy, but reflect Islamic rather than Western liberal values. Hasan al-Turabi, Rashid al-Ghannushi, and Yusuf al-Qaradawi have advocated different forms of this view.
 The liberal Islamic view is influenced by Muhammad Abduh's emphasis on the role of reason in understanding religion. It stresses democratic principles based on pluralism and freedom of thought. Authors like Fahmi Huwaidi and Tariq al-Bishri have constructed Islamic justifications for full citizenship of non-Muslims in an Islamic state by drawing on early Islamic texts. Others, like Mohammed Arkoun and Nasr Hamid Abu Zayd, have justified pluralism and freedom through non-literalist approaches to textual interpretation. Abdolkarim Soroush has argued for a "religious democracy" based on religious thought that is democratic, tolerant, and just. Islamic liberals argue for the necessity of constant reexamination of religious understanding, which can only be done in a democratic context.

Secularist views

In the modern history of the Muslim world, the notion of secularism has acquired strong negative connotations due to its association with foreign colonial domination and the removal of religious values from the public sphere. Traditional Islamic theory distinguishes between matters of religion (din) and state (dawla), but insists that political authority and public life must be guided by religious values. Some Islamic reformists like Ali Abdel Raziq and Mahmoud Mohammed Taha have advocated a secular state in the sense of political order that does not impose any single interpretation of sharia on the nation, though they did not advocate secularism in the sense of a morally neutral exercise of state power. The Islamic scholar Abdullahi Ahmed An-Na'im has argued for a secular state built on constitutionalism, human rights and full citizenship, seeking to demonstrate that his vision is more consistent with Islamic history than visions of an Islamic state. Proponents of Islamism (political Islam) reject secularist views that would limit Islam to a matter of personal belief and insist on implementation of Islamic principles in the legal and political spheres. Moreover, the concept of 'Separation of Powers' was propounded by Ruhollah Khomeini.

Muhammad Iqbal
The modern Islamic philosopher, Muhammad Iqbal, viewed the early Islamic Caliphate as being compatible with democracy. He "welcomed the formation of popularly elected legislative assemblies" in the Muslim world as a "return to the original purity of Islam." He argued that Islam had the "gems of an economic and democratic organization of society", but that this growth was stunted by the monarchist rule of Umayyad Caliphate, which established the Caliphate as a great Islamic empire but led to political Islamic ideals being "repaganized" and the early Muslims losing sight of the "most important potentialities of their faith."

Muhammad Asad
Another Muslim scholar and thinker, Muhammad Asad, viewed democracy as perfectly compatible with Islam. In his book The Principles of State and Government in Islam, he notes:
Viewed from this historical perspective, 'democracy' as conceived in the modern West is infinitely nearer to the Islamic than to the ancient Greek concept of liberty; for Islam maintains that all human beings are socially equal and must, therefore, be given the same opportunities for development and self-expression. On the other hand, Islam makes it incumbent upon Muslims to subordinate their decisions to the guidance of the Divine Law revealed in the Qur'ãn and exemplified by the Prophet: an obligation which imposes definite limits on the community's right to legislate and denies to the 'will of the people' that attribute of sovereignty which forms so integral a part of the Western concept of democracy.

Abul A'la Maududi
Islamist writer and politician Abul A'la Maududi, conceived of an "Islamic state" that would eventually "rule the earth". The antithesis of secular Western democracy, it would follow an all-embracing Sharia law. Maududi called the system he outlined a "theo-democracy", which he argued would be different from a theocracy as the term is understood in the Christian West, because it would be run by the entire Muslim community (pious Muslims who followed sharia), rather than ruled by a clerical class in the name of God.

Maududi's vision has been criticized (by Youssef M. Choueiri) as an
ideological state in which legislators do not legislate, citizens only vote to reaffirm the permanent applicability of God's laws, women rarely venture outside their homes lest social discipline be disrupted, and non-Muslims are tolerated as foreign elements required to express their loyalty by means of paying a financial levy.

L. Ali Khan
Legal scholar L. Ali Khan argues that Islam is fully compatible with democracy. In his book, A Theory of Universal Democracy, Khan provides a critique of liberal democracy and secularism. He presents the concept of "fusion state" in which religion and state are fused. There are no contradictions in God's universe, says Khan. Contradictions represent the limited knowledge that human beings have. According to the Quran and the Sunnah, Muslims are fully capable of preserving spirituality and self-rule.

Javed Ahmed Ghamdi
Religious scholar, Javed Ahmed Ghamdi interprets the Quranic verses as ''The collective affairs of Muslims are run on the basis of mutual consultations'' (42:37). He is of the view that all the matters of a Muslim state must be sought out through consultations.The parliamentary bodies would provide that platform to practice and implement those consultations.

Views of the general Muslim public
Esposito and DeLong-Bas distinguish four attitudes toward Islam and democracy prominent among Muslims today:

 Advocacy of democratic ideas, often accompanied by a belief that they are compatible with Islam, which can play a public role within a democratic system, as exemplified by many protestors who took part in the Arab Spring uprisings;
 Support for democratic procedures such as elections, combined with religious or moral objections toward some aspects of Western democracy seen as incompatible with sharia, as exemplified by Islamic scholars like Yusuf al-Qaradawi;
 Rejection of democracy as a Western import and advocacy of traditional Islamic institutions, such as shura (consultation) and ijma (consensus), as exemplified by supporters of absolute monarchy and radical Islamist movements;
 Belief that democracy requires restricting religion to private life, held by a minority in the Muslim world.

Polls conducted by Gallup and PEW in Muslim-majority countries indicate that most Muslims see no contradiction between democratic values and religious principles, desiring neither a theocracy, nor a secular democracy, but rather a political model where democratic institutions and values can coexist with the values and principles of Islam.

Islam and democracy in practice

Obstacles

There are several ideas on the relationship between Islam in the Middle East and democracy. Waltz writes that transformations to democracy seemed on the whole to pass by the Islamic Middle East at a time when such transformations were a central theme in other parts of the world, although she does note that, of late, the increasing number of elections being held in the region indicates some form of adoption of democratic traditions.

Following the Arab Spring, professor Olivier Roy of the European University Institute in an article in Foreign Policy has described political Islam as "increasingly interdependent" with democracy, such that "neither can now survive without the other".

Orientalist scholars offer another viewpoint on the relationship between Islam and democratisation in the Middle East. They argue that the compatibility is simply not there between secular democracy and Arab-Islamic culture in the Middle East which has a strong history of undemocratic beliefs and authoritarian power structures. Kedourie, a well known Orientalist scholar, said for example: "to hold simultaneously ideas which are not easily reconcilable argues, then, a deep confusion in the Arab public mind, at least about the meaning of democracy. The confusion is, however, understandable since the idea of democracy is quite alien to the mind-set of Islam." A view similar to this that understands Islam and democracy to be incompatible because of seemingly irreconcilable differences between Sharia and democratic ideals is also held by some Islamists.

However, within Islam there are ideas held by some that believe Islam and democracy in some form are indeed compatible due to the existence of the concept of shura (meaning consultation) in the Quran. Views such as this have been expressed by various thinkers and political activists in the Middle East. They continue to be the subject of controversy, e.g. at the second Dubai Debates, which debated the question "Can Arab and Islamic values be reconciled with democracy?"

Brian Whitaker's 'four major obstacles'
Writing on The Guardian website, Brian Whitaker, the paper's Middle East editor, argued that there were four major obstacles to democracy in the region: 'the imperial legacy', 'oil wealth', 'the Arab–Israeli conflict' and ' "militant" Islam'.

The imperial legacy includes the borders of the modern states themselves and the existence of significant minorities within the states. Acknowledgment of these differences is frequently suppressed usually in the cause of "national unity" and sometimes to obscure the fact that minority elite is controlling the country. Brian Whitaker argues that this leads to the formation of political parties on ethnic, religious or regional divisions, rather than over policy differences. Voting therefore becomes an assertion of one's identity rather than a real choice.

The problem with oil and the wealth it generates is that the states' rulers have the wealth to remain in power, as they can pay off or repress most potential opponents. Brian Whitaker argues that as there is no need for taxation there is less pressure for representation. Furthermore, Western governments require a stable source of oil and are therefore more prone to maintain the status quo, rather than push for reforms which may lead to periods of instability. This can be linked into political economy explanations for the occurrence of authoritarian regimes and lack of democracy in the Middle East, particularly the prevalence of rentier states in the Middle East. A consequence of the lack of taxation that Whitaker talks of in such rentier economies is an inactive civil society. As civil society is seen to be an integral part of democracy it raises doubts over the feasibility of democracy developing in the Middle East in such situations.

Whitaker's third point is that the Arab–Israeli conflict serves as a unifying factor for the countries of the Arab League, and also serves as an excuse for repression by Middle Eastern governments. For example, in March 2004 Sheikh Mohammad Hussein Fadlallah, Lebanon's leading Shia cleric, is reported as saying "We have emergency laws, we have control by the security agencies, we have stagnation of opposition parties, we have the appropriation of political rights – all this in the name of the Arab-Israeli conflict". The West, especially the US, is also seen as a supporter of Israel, and so it and its institutions, including democracy, are seen by many Muslims as suspect. Khaled Abou El Fadl, a lecturer in Islamic law at the University of California comments "modernity, despite its much scientific advancement, reached Muslims packaged in the ugliness of disempowerment and alienation."

This repression by secularistic Arab rulers has led to the growth of radical Islamic movement groups, as they believe that the institution of an Islamic theocracy will lead to a more just society. These groups tend to be very intolerant of alternative views however, including the ideas of democracy. Many Muslims who argue that Islam and democracy are compatible live in the West, and are therefore seen as "contaminated" by non-Islamic ideas.

Practice

 The Green Algeria Alliance is an Islamist coalition of political parties, created for the legislative election, 2012 in Algeria. It consists of the Movement of Society for Peace, Islamic Renaissance Movement (Ennahda) and the Movement for National Reform (Islah). The alliance is led by Bouguerra Soltani of the MSP. However, the incumbent coalition, consisting of the FLN of President Abdelaziz Bouteflika and the RND of Prime Minister Ahmed Ouyahia, held on to power after winning a majority of seats and the Islamist parties of the Green Algeria Alliance lost seats in legislative election of 2012.
 Shia Islamist Al Wefaq, Salafi Islamist Al Asalah and Sunni Islamist Al-Menbar Islamic Society are dominant democratic forces in Bahrain.
 During the Bangladesh Liberation War, the Jamaat-e-Islami of Pakistan opposed the independence of Bangladesh, but established itself there as an independent political party, the Bangladesh Jamaat-e-Islami after 1975. The Bangladesh Nationalist Party is the second largest party in the Parliament of Bangladesh and the main opposition party. The BNP promotes a center-right policy combining elements of conservatism, Islamism, nationalism and anti-communism. The party believes that Islam is an integral part of the socio-cultural life of Bangladesh, and favors Islamic principles and cultural views. Since 2000, it has been allied with the Islamic parties Jamaat-e-Islami Bangladesh and Islami Oikya Jote.
 The Party of Democratic Action is the largest political party in Bosnia and Herzegovina. The Party of Democratic Action was founded in May 1990 by reformist Islamist Alija Izetbegović, representing the conservative Bosniaks and other Slavic Muslim population in Bosnia and Herzegovina and the former Yugoslavia.
 In the 2011–12 Egyptian parliamentary election, the political parties identified as "Islamist" and "democratic" (the Muslim Brotherhood's Freedom and Justice Party, Salafist Al-Nour Party and liberal Islamist Al-Wasat Party) won 75% of the total seats. Mohamed Morsi, an Islamist democrat was the first Islamist president of Egypt, stemming from the Muslim Brotherhood.
 Nahdlatul Ulama and Muhammadiyah are two very influential Islamic social movement in Indonesia. United Development Party and the opposition Prosperous Justice Party are major Indonesian Islamist parties, active in country's democratic process.
 The Islamic Action Front is Jordan's Islamist political party and largest democratic political force in country. The IAF's survival in Jordan is primarily due to its flexibility and less radical approach to politics.
 The Islamic Group is a Sunni Islamist and Hezbollah is a Shia Islamist political party in Lebanon.
 The Justice and Construction Party is the Muslim Brotherhood's political arm in Libya and the second largest political force in the country. National Forces Alliance, largest political group in country, doesn't believe the country should be run entirely by Sharia law or secular law, but does hold that Sharia should be "the main inspiration for legislation". Party leader Jibril has said the NFA is a moderate Islamic movement that recognises the importance of Islam in political life and favours Sharia as the basis of the law.
 The United Malays National Organisation is the dominant party of Malaysia since that county's independence in 1957. UMNO sees and defines itself as a moderate Islamist, Islamic democratic and social conservative party of Muslim Malays. The Pan-Malaysian Islamic Party is a major opposition party and is relatively more conservative and traditionalist than the UMNO.
 The Moroccan Justice and Development Party has been the ruling party in Morocco since November 29, 2011. The Justice and Development Party advocates Islamism and Islamic democracy.
 The Muslim Brotherhood of Syria is a Sunni Islamist force in Syria and very loosely affiliated to the Egyptian Muslim Brotherhood. It has also been called the "dominant group" or "dominant force" in the Arab Spring uprising in Syria. The group's stated political positions are moderate and in its most recent April 2012 manifesto it "pledges to respect individual rights", to promote pluralism and democracy.
 The Islamic Renaissance Party of Tajikistan is Tajikistan's Islamist party and main opposition and democratic force in that country.
 The Ennahda Movement, also known as Renaissance Party or simply Ennahda, is a moderate Islamist political party in Tunisia. On March 1, 2011, after the government of Zine El Abidine Ben Ali collapsed in the wake of the 2011 Tunisian revolution, Tunisia's interim government granted the group permission to form a political party. Since then it has become the biggest and most well-organized party in Tunisia, so far outdistancing its more secular competitors. In the Tunisian Constituent Assembly election, 2011, the first honest election in the country's history with a turn out of 51.1% of all eligible voters, the party won 37.04% of the popular vote and 89 (41%) of the 217 assembly seats, far more than any other party.

Pakistan
Early in the history of the state of Pakistan (March 12, 1949), a parliamentary resolution (the Objectives Resolution) was adopted, stating the objectives on which the future constitution of the country was to be based. It contained the basic principles of both Islam and Western Democracy, in accordance with the vision of the founders of the Pakistan Movement (Muhammad Iqbal, Muhammad Ali Jinnah, Liaquat Ali Khan). It proclaimed:

This resolution was included in the 1956 constitution as preamble and in 1985 it was inserted in the constitution itself as Article 2 and Schedule item 53 (but with the word "freely" in Provision shall be made for the religious minorities to freely profess and practice their religions and develop their cultures, removed.). The resolution was inserted again in the constitution in 2010, with the word "freely" reinstated.

However, Islamisation has proceeded slowly in Pakistan, and Islamists and Islamic parties and activists have expressed frustration that sharia law has not yet been fully implemented.

Indonesia
Officially, Indonesia does not have a state religion, and is in many respects a secular democracy. The constitution of Indonesia gives its people the freedom of worship, according to their religion or belief. This is based on the state ideology of "Pancasila" whose first tenet, Ketuhanan yang Maha Esa, translates as "The One and Almighty God", implying that there is a supreme God that unites the nation. It does not specify any religion, though this is also sometimes mistranslated as an endorsement for monotheism. As a result, Indonesians do have a religion column in their identity card; however, it is not mandatory (an empty column will indicate not having a religion) and is only used for census (which is a Dutch colonial legacy). The 5th points of practice of the Butir-butir pengamalan Pancasila states “Religion and belief in God Almighty are private matters that concerns the human relationship with God Almighty.” Sukarno's conception of Pancasila's ideology is not 'secular' in the Western sense, although he agreed with Mahmud Esad Bay and Mustafa Kemal Ataturks' view that Islam should be free of government control. In his speech titled "Islam Sontoloyo" or "Foolish Islam", he was critical of Islamic leaders misuse of authority to justify wrong actions. According to Yudi Latief, Indonesia's founding leaders, while thoroughly educated and motivated as secularists of the time, cannot comprehend an Indonesian society without religion. Indonesian nationalist leaders characterized the country as a “religiously neutral state”, in which Islam would be separated from the state and that Islamic affairs should be managed by Muslims without the help of the state. Preliminary meeting based on Hatta's initiative agreed that Islamic laws can be used for family laws that is signed through the People's Representative Council, but only if it relates to Muslims. Whereas the ‘secular’ national criminal code are not allowed to be changed because it applies to all regardless of religion. Sukarno also banned the most popular Islamic party at the time of Masjumi, as they were allegedly involved in the PRRI rebellion. On 27 January 1953, Sukarno delivered a speech in Amuntai, South Kalimantan, a region with a strong Islamic community. There was a banner reading "Indonesia a Nation State or an Islamic State?” Commenting on the banner, Soekarno said:  Sukarno have also disagreed on Aceh adopting Islamic criminal laws as its form of sharia bylaws, stating that "Indonesia is a nation state with the ideology of Pancasila, not a theocratic country with a certain religious orientation" and "Muslim's habit of reading the Quran" are also a form of obedience towards sharia. According to Sukarno, religion is a private matter between oneself and god, that could only be regulated through personal or family matters. During the Suharto era, Islamic parties are even more controlled by his government, through the state formation of the United Development Party. Not only that, Islamic veils were banned. Nurcholis Majid, one of the prominent young Islamic thinkers at the time, in his speech “The Need for Reform in Islamic Thinking and the Problem of Ummah Integration”,  considered Indonesian Muslims to be stuck in ideological dogmatism, and as a result lose dynamism. As a result, he coined the famous slogan: "Islam Yes Islamic Party No". Most of his colleagues considered this to be an endorsement of secularism. However, as noted by Abdurrahman Wahid and his contemporaries, the fourth president of Indonesia explained Indonesia's case as "mild secularism". Neither of them considered themselves to be secularist and prefer to use 'secularisation', acknowledging the reservation that secularism as an ideology can become a new closed world view which functions like a new religion.

However, there is another political movement centered in universities students small groups called "liqo", started in 1970, which is directly inspired by Hasan al-Banna's Muslim Brotherhood, the proponent of which is Hilmi Aminuddin, which advocates for a gradual change to become more ideal Muslim. This coalesced in the formation of KAMMI in 1998, which is alongside of Abdurrahman Wahid's Nahdlatul Ulama (NU) and Amien Rais' Muhammadiyah as student leaders formed the groups of student protests against Suharto's government. After the fall of Suharto, KAMMI become the political party Prosperous Justice Party (PKS), while NU and Muhammadiyah chose not to be involved in practical politics of winning elections and instead forming independent political parties which are aligned but independent of their Islamic organization, in the form of the National Awakening Party (PKB) and National Mandate Party (PAN). The democratic reformation gave impetus to the adoption of Islamic sharia law in the form of adoption of the Jakarta Charter was pushed to the national legislative body (MPR) in 2002, however it was rejected with even PKB and PAN rejecting it.

This is because the two largest Muslim organizations of Indonesia, NU and Muhammadiyah, very much accepted the pancasila 'secularism' basis of the country. NU and its most associated party PKB (Abdurrahman's party), is member of centrist democrat international which also contain famously German's CDU as well as Hungary's Fidesz party, it is more common with Christian Democrat politics in the West. There are parties associated with the Muslim Brotherhood in the form of PKS but even they have to commit to the state ideology, which means they are pluralist. Islamic groups that stray from and tried to change Pancasila such as HTI (Indonesian branch of Hizb ut-Tahrir) is banned even though they 'participated' in a democracy.

In a practical sense, in central government levels, Indonesia has 6 recognized religions, as these are the recognized majority religions of most Indonesians and received state support.

In the Ministry of Religions there are separate religious leaders administrators for each of the 6 major religions. Sometimes the president or government members in a formal speech will greet in all 6 religious greetings. Example of which in President Joko Widodo's speech on March 26, 2021. In which he used all religious greetings including:

"Assalamu’alaikum warahmatullahi wabarakatuh" for Muslims
"Salam Sejahtera" and "Shaloom" for Christians and Catholics
"Om Swastyastu" for Hindus
"Namo Buddhaya" for Buddhists
"Salam Kebajikan" or "Wei De Dong Tian" (惟德動天) for Kong Hu Cu (Confucians)

Some Indonesian Muslims in its history had always had problems with the implementation of sharia law, seeing it as not necessary and infringing on the non-Muslim population, while others see the implementation of some sharia-based laws as a solution to a failed and corrupt democratic process, while also inspired by Aceh successful push for local sharia law to be adopted. Indonesian history had a rebellion in the 1960s known locally as "Darul Islam" rebellion which tried to forcefully form an "Islamic State of Indonesia" although they were eventually defeated, its regional offshoot based in Aceh advocating for independence, however they managed to continue an insurgency for a separate Islamic Aceh country, as a result of the Boxing Day tsunami in 2004 and negotiations facilitated by the Swedish government (Hasan di Tiro had a Swedish passport and lived there in exile) as well as Finnish government, Helsinki MoU was signed. Indonesia would allow Aceh to adopt its own version of shariah law called Qanun, and Aceh would stop fighting for independence and adopt special autonomy law. Still it would be wrong to describe Indonesia as an Islamic country as it would refer to that rebellion and denote Indonesia's official religion as Islam or describe Indonesian society as "Islamic". This was a common misconception by foreign journalists to describe Indonesia as such or Indonesia as "the Muslim democracy" which is also inaccurate. A better description of Indonesia would be a "democracy with a Muslim-majority population".

Iran

Theory
Since the revolution in Iran, the largest Shia country, Twelver Shia political thought has been dominated by that of Ayatollah Ruhollah Khomeini, the founder and leader of the revolution. Khomeini argued that in the absence of the Hidden Imam and other divinely-appointed figures (in whom ultimate political authority rests), Muslims have not only the right, but also the obligation to establish an "Islamic state". To that end they must turn to scholars of Islamic law (fiqh) who are qualified to interpret the Quran and the writings of the imams.

Once in power and recognizing the need for more flexibility, Khomeini modified some earlier positions, insisted the ruling jurist need not be one of the most learned, that Sharia rule was subordinate to interests of Islam (Maslaha—"expedient interests" or "public welfare"), and the "divine government" as interpreted by the ruling jurists, who could overrule Sharia if necessary to serve those interests. The Islamic "government, which is a branch of the absolute governance of the Prophet of God, is among the primary ordinances of Islam, and has precedence over all 'secondary' ordinances."

The last point was made in December 1987, when Khomieni issued a fatwa in support of the Islamic government's attempt to pass a labor protection bill not in accordance with sharia. He ruled that in the Islamic state, governmental ordinances were primary ordinances, and that the Islamic state has absolute right to enact state commandments, taking precedence over "all secondary ordinances such as prayer, fasting, and pilgrimage".

Were the powers of government to lie only within the framework of secondary divine decrees, the designation of the divine government and absolute deputed guardianship (wilayat-i mutlaqa-yi mufawwada) to the Prophet of Islam (peace be upon him and his progeny) would have been in practice entirely without meaning and content. ... I must point out, the government which is a branch of the absolute governance of the Prophet of God is among the primary ordinances of Islam, and has precedence over all secondary ordinances such as prayer (salat), fasting (sawm), and pilgrimage (hajj).

The idea and concept of Islamic democracy has been accepted by many Iranian clerics, scholars and intellectuals. The most notable of those who have accepted the theory of Islamic democracy is probably Iran's Leader, Ayatollah Ali Khamenei, who mentions Islamic democracy as "Mardomsalarie Dini" in his speeches. Nevertheless, Khamenei openly expresses his opposition to liberal democracy, having said, "Islam naturally stands against liberal democracy."

There are also other Iranian scholars who oppose or at least criticise the concept of Islamic democracy. Among the most popular of them are Ayatollah Naser Makarem Shirazi who have written: "If not referring to the people votes would result in accusations of tyranny then it is allowed to accept people vote as a secondary commandment." Also Mohammad-Taqi Mesbah-Yazdi has more or less the same viewpoint.

Practice
Some Iranians, including Mohammad Khatami, categorize the Islamic Republic of Iran as a kind of religious democracy. They maintain that Ruhollah Khomeini held the same view as well and that's why he strongly chose "Jomhoorie Eslami" (Islamic Republic) over "Hokoomate Eslami" (Islamic State).

Others maintain that not only is the Islamic Republic of Iran undemocratic (see Politics of Iran) but that Khomeini himself opposed the principle of democracy in his book Hokumat-e Islami: Wilayat al-Faqih, where he denied the need for any legislative body saying, "no one has the right to legislate ... except ... the Divine Legislator", and during the Islamic Revolution, when he told Iranians, "Do not use this term, 'democratic.' That is the Western style." Although it is in contrast with his commandment to Mehdi Bazargan. It is a subject of lively debate among pro-Islamic Iranian intelligentsia. Also they maintain that Iran's sharia courts, the Islamic Revolutionary Court, blasphemy laws of the Islamic Republic of Iran, and the Islamic religious police violate the principles of democratic governance. However, it should be understood that when a democracy is accepted to be Islamic by people, the law of Islam becomes the democratically ratified law of that country. Iranians have ratified the constitution in which the principle rules are explicitly mentioned as the rules of Islam to which other rules should conform. Khomeini fervently believed that principles of democracy can't provide the targeted justice of Islam in the Sharia and Islamic thoughts.(Mohaghegh. Behnam 2014)
This contrast of view between the two Iranian head leaders of this Islamic country, as above mentioned about Khatami's and Khomeini's views have provisionally been being a case of disaffiliation of nearly half a country in most probable political coincidence, so the people cognizant of this heterogeneous political belief shall not be affiliated by newly formed views of democratic principles.(Mohaghegh, Behnam 2014)

A number of deviations from traditional sharia regulations have been noted in Iran

 ... the financial system has barely been Islamized; Christians, for example, are not subject to a poll tax and pay according to the common scheme. Insurance is maintained (even though chance, the very basis for insurance should theoretically be excluded from all contracts). The contracts signed with foreigners all accept the matter of interest.

Indices of democracy in Muslim countries
There are several non-governmental organizations that publish and maintain indices of democracy in the world, according to their own various definitions of the term, and rank countries as being free, partly free, or unfree using various measures of freedom, including political rights, economic rights, freedom of the press and civil liberties.

The following lists Muslim-majority countries and shows the scores given by two frequently used indices: 2022 Democracy Index by the Economist Intelligence Unit and Freedom in the World (2018) by the US-based Freedom House. These indices are frequently used in Western media, but have attracted some criticism and may not reflect recent changes.

Key: ‡ – Disputed territory (according to Freedom House)

Islamic democratic parties and organizations
This is a list of parties and organizations which aim for the implementation of Sharia or an Islamic State, or subscribe to Muslim identity politics, or in some other way fulfil the definitions of political Islam, activist Islam, or Islamism laid out in this article; or have been widely described as such by others.

See also
 Institute on Religion and Democracy
 Dialogue Among Civilizations
 The Clash of Civilizations
 Freedom deficit
 Islamic ethics
 Islamic revival
 Islamism
 Islam Yes, Islamic Party No

References

Bibliography
 Mahmoud Sadri and Ahmad Sadri (eds.) 2002 Reason, Freedom, and Democracy in Islam: Essential Writings of Abdolkarim Soroush, Oxford University Press
 Omid Safi (ed.) 2003 Progressive Muslims: On Justice, Gender and Pluralism, Oneworld
 Azzam S. Tamimi 2001 Rachid Ghannouchi: A Democrat within Islamism, Oxford University Press
 Khan L. Ali 2003 A Theory of Universal Democracy, Martinus Nijhoff Publishers
 Khatab, Sayed & G. Bouma, Democracy in Islam, Routledge 2007

External links
 Liberal Democracy and Political Islam: The Search for Common Ground
 Islam and Democracy: Perceptions and Misperceptions by Dr. Mohammad Omar Farooq
 Democracy and the Muslim World
 Islamic Democracies (article)
 Preview of the Seoul Conference on The Community of Democracies: Challenges and Threats to Democracy
 Marina Ottoway, et al., Democratic Mirage in the Middle East Carnegie Endowment for Ethics and International Peace, Policy Brief 20, (October 20, 2002).
 The Muslim's world future is freedom Book review, with some controversial content.
 Expect the Unexpected: A Religious Democracy in Iran
 Iranian President Mohammad Khatami Vows to Establish Religious Democracy in Iran
 Recent Elections and the Future of Religious Democracy in Iran
 Democracy Lacking in Muslim World 

 
Sharia
Religion and politics